Year 424 (CDXXIV) was a leap year starting on Tuesday (link will display the full calendar) of the Julian calendar. At the time, it was known as the Year of the Consulship of Castinus and Victor (or, less frequently, year 1177 Ab urbe condita). The denomination 424 for this year has been used since the early medieval period, when the Anno Domini calendar era became the prevalent method in Europe for naming years.

Events 
 By place 

 Roman Empire 
 October 23 – Emperor Theodosius II nominates his cousin Valentinian, age 5, the imperial title nobilissimus Caesar ("most noble") of the Western Roman Empire. Valentinian is betrothed to Theodosius's own daughter Licinia Eudoxia, who is only 2 years old.
 Roman usurper Joannes sends Flavius Aetius, governor of the Palace (cura palatii), to the Huns to ask for their assistance. After negotiating, he returns to Italy with a large force.
 Winter – A Roman army under the command of Ardaburius leaves Thessalonica (modern Central Macedonia) and marches for Northern Italy, where they make their base at Aquileia.

 China 
 Shao Di, age 18, is deposed by a group of high officials and succeeded by his younger brother Wen Di as emperor of the Liu Song Dynasty. Shao is exiled to Suzhou, and later killed by an assassin.

Births

Death 
 Shao Di, emperor of the Liu Song Dynasty (b. 406)

References